The Watchtower of Arrebatacapas (Spanish: Atalaya de Arrebatacapas) is a watchtower located in Torrelaguna, Spain. It was declared Bien de Interés Cultural in 1983.

References

External links 

Towers in Spain
Bien de Interés Cultural landmarks in the Community of Madrid
Castles in the Community of Madrid